Sabina Sariteanu (born 26 June 1981), née Popescu, is a Romanian chess player who holds the title of Woman FIDE Master (WFM) (2006).

Biography
Sabina Sariteanu repeatedly represented Romania at the European Youth Chess Championships and World Youth Chess Championships in different age groups, where she won gold medal in 1991, at the first European Youth Chess Championship in the U10 girls age group. She won two gold (1991, 1998) and bronze (1995) medals in Romanian Youth Chess Championships in different girl's age groups. In 1997, in Visegrád Sabina Sariteanu won the International Women's Chess Tournament, and the following year in Tapolca she won 3rd place in the International Women's Chess Tournament. In 1998, Sabina Sariteanu won the Romanian Women's Team Chess Championship with Bucharest chess club team.

References

External links

Sabina Sariteanu chess games at 365Chess.com

1981 births
Living people
Romanian female chess players
Chess Woman FIDE Masters